Rowing was contested at the 2015 Summer Universiade from July 6 to 8 at the Tangeum Lake International Reggeta Course in Chungju, South Korea.

Medal summary

Medal table

Men's events

Women's events

References

External links
2015 Summer Universiade – Rowing

Universiade
2015 Summer Universiade events